Virðulegu Forsetar (Icelandic for Honorable presidents) is the second studio album by Icelandic musician Jóhann Jóhannsson, released by Touch Music in 2004. It consists of one ambient-influenced classical piece using the same phrase throughout, divided into four parts for technical reasons.

Performance at remembrance concert
After Jóhannsson's death in 2018, Adam Wiltzie, a close friend, organised a remembrance performance of Virðulegu Forsetar on what would have been Jóhannsson's 49th birthday. The concert took place at the Church of Saint John The Baptist at the Béguinage in Brussels.

Track listing

Personnel
Bass, Electronics – Skúli Sverrisson
Conductor – Guðni Franzson
Ensemble – The Caput Ensemble
Glockenspiel, bells, electronics – Mathias M.D. Hemstock
Horns – Anna Sigurbjörnsdóttir, Einar St. Jónsson, Emil Friðfinnsson, Stefán Jón Bernharðsson, Þorkell Jóelsson
Organ – Guðmundur Sigurðsson, Hörður Bragason
Photography – Jon Wozencroft, Kari Ósk Ege
Recording, mastering, authoring – Sveinn Kjartansson
Trumpet – Eiríkur Örn Pálsson, Ásgeir Steingrímsson*
Tuba – Sigurður Már Valsson
Writing, arranging, production, piano, electronics – Jóhann Jóhannsson

References

External links
 
 

2004 albums
Electronic albums by Icelandic artists
Jóhann Jóhannsson albums